The City Municipality of Slovenj Gradec is a municipality in northern Slovenia. The seat of the municipality is the town of Slovenj Gradec. It is part of the historic Styria region, and since 2005 it has belonged to the NUTS-3 Carinthia Statistical Region.

It is the smallest of the twelve city municipalities of Slovenia.

Settlements

In addition to the municipal seat of Slovenj Gradec, the municipality also includes the following settlements:

 Brda
 Gmajna
 Golavabuka
 Gradišče
 Graška Gora
 Legen
 Mislinjska Dobrava
 Pameče
 Podgorje
 Raduše
 Sele
 Šmartno pri Slovenj Gradcu
 Šmiklavž
 Spodnji Razbor
 Stari Trg
 Tomaška Vas
 Troblje
 Turiška Vas
 Vodriž
 Vrhe
 Zgornji Razbor

References

External links
 
 Slovenj Gradec municipal website 
 City Municipality of Slovenj Gradec on Geopedia

 
Slovenj Gradec